The Still Point is a 1986 Australian film directed by Barbara Boyd-Anderson. Sarah, (Nadine Garner), a 15-year-old girl, who has a hearing impairment, is entering a crisis period in her life. Her future depends on the ability to emerge from the sheltered world her mother has created for her. In doing this she puts aside the self-imposed isolation of her deafness, and learns the value of her own identity.

Plot
The film opens with 15 year old Sarah (Nadine Garner) in a ballet lesson with her dance teacher. But it is in art class, where it becomes clear that her fellow students regard Sarah as an unhappy loner. At home she also feels alienated. Sarah's mother Barbara (Lyn Semmler) is dating Paul (Alex Menglet), who wants to move in, but Barbara explains that Sarah needs to get used to the idea first. When Sarah arrives home from school and sees Paul, she ducks out of sight, upset.

Sarah meets with her father Bill, and tries to get invited along to Canberra where he's doing a job, but he is evasive. When she returns home, Barbara tries to discuss Paul with Sarah, mentioning how she was unhappy for a long time with Bill, but Sarah gets agitated and storms off to her room.

Barbara sends Sarah off to see her grandfather, Warren. Using binoculars, Sarah spots some teenagers on the beach dancing to music, with a handsome guy, later revealed to be David (Steve Bastoni) on guitar. A lady arrIves together with her teenage daughter Simone, who invites Sarah to a party on the weekend. Later, her grandfather tells her she should socialise with the teenagers on the beach, but Sarah is hesitant, revealing that one of the things that makes her feel insecure, is her hearing impairment.

Barbara arrives at Warren's with gifts, including a frilly blue dress for Sarah, but Sarah immediately grills her, wanting to invite her father down, and berating Barbara for not initially telling her about her courtship with Paul.

Sarah attends the party on the weekend, and feels out of place. The party-goers mock her for her dress and for not smoking. David arrives and asks Sarah to dance, causing his ex-girlfriend Simone to become agitated. The following day Sarah turns up at the beach, and when Simone discovers Sarah has a hearing problem, she taunts her. Sarah flees and David berates his friends for being immature.

David visits Sarah, asking for a chance to explain, and they kiss. They bond over what they might each do in life. When he asks her about her plans, Sarah says she'll probably fail because she's deaf, and David tries to alleviate her concerns about her insecurities.

Barbara starts prying about David, saying it would be best if the pair don't get too serious. Sarah snaps at her and Barbara follows suit, and Paul's name comes up again.

At the boat shed, Simone turns up to harass David about Sarah, but he tells her to leave Sarah alone. David then turns up at Warren's house in a bright red Renault Fuego, inviting Sarah for a ride. They head off to a sideshow with David's friends, where Simone snorts some drugs, and concocts some childish games, out of jealousy. David takes Simone aside for a dressing down, but she tries to revive old memories by hugging him, just as Sarah arrives to see the pair.

Back at home, a tearful Sarah contemplates her situation. David turns up to apologise, explaining that Simone was on drugs, but Sarah walks out on him. She later reconsiders and decides to go see David at the boat shed, but a depressed David is elsewhere, hanging out with his mates. They tease him about his new girlfriend, with Tony (Greg Fleet) cheekily saying he hears that the quiet ones put out. David angrily warns Tony not to go anywhere near Sarah, and Peter (Ben Mendelsohn) tells them both to knock it off. Tony apologises, and offers his hand to David.

Meanwhile, Paul turns up at Warren's house. When Sarah arrives home and sees him, she slams the door and angrily strides past. Barbara resolves to go and talk to her, but when Sarah says she's off to see her dad, they fight, and have to be separated, whereupon Sarah storms off.

Later, a tearful Barbara approaches Sarah in the garden. Barbara reminisces about the time before Sarah was born, when she was young and expecting to get married and live happily ever after, only to discover that she and Bill had nothing in common. They thought if they had a baby, it would fix everything. But having Sarah only caused more issues. Sarah asks whether her hearing impairment was the reason for their break up, but Barbara reveals it was because she pushed Bill away, as Sarah was her everything. Paul appears in the garden with a packed bag and Barbara approaches him. Sarah looks at the distant couple, and then looks away.

Cast
 Nadine Garner as Sarah
 Steve Bastoni as David
 Ben Mendelsohn as Peter 
 Greg Fleet as Tony
 Alex Menglet as Paul
 Lynn Semmler as Barbara
 Kristy Grant as Simone
 Jodie Yemm as Bianca
 Sarah Lassez as Jane
 Angioletta Schwarz as Pamela
 Sassy Havyatt as Helen
 Katrina Logan as Chloe
 Johnny Quinn as Bill
 Marcus White as Andrew
 Cindy Lee as Cathy
 Robin Cuming as Warren Smith
 Dianne Parrington as Ballet Teacher
 Rona McLeod as Art Teacher
 Gerry Mertagh as Waiter
 Ricky Scibiliamaas as Paper Boy

Production
Producer Rosa Colosimo has been trying to raise finance for a film Blowing Hot and Cold and had found an investor who was willing to give her $100,000 provided the money was spent by the end of the financial year. This was April and Colosimo had until 30 June she was unlikely to be able to raise funds for Blowing Hot and Cold so she wrote a new script with an old friend of hers, Barbara Boyd-Anderson and raised some more money. The first draft was written in three days, with two more drafts the following week.

The film was shot in Melbourne on 16mm.

Filming Locations
Melbourne and surrounds – the credits thank Malvern, Victoria and Melbourne City Councils and the Shire of Bulla; Cinema Papers locates the sea-side town where the heroine's grand-dad lives as being Mount Martha, Victoria, some 60 kilometres south-east of Melbourne.

Reception
Colosimo distributed the film herself, which performed well in Canberra but poorly in Sydney and Melbourne.

Awards
 Victoria and Tasmania Highly Commended Award (Winner) with the Australian Cinematographers Society (1987)

References

External links

Australian coming-of-age drama films
1986 films
1980s English-language films